"Washed by the Water" is a 2007 song by the Christian rock band Needtobreathe from their second studio album The Heat. It was released as a radio single at the end of 2007, becoming a No. 1 hit in the spring of 2008. It was the sixth most-played song on R&R's Christian CHR chart for 2008.

Background
The song was written by the Rinehart brothers about their father who was a pastor. Lead singer Bear Rinehart said, "It's a song about my dad. He's a pastor ... There was some stuff that got said at our church that actually turned out to not be true when it all came out. I just thought it was a cool thing that my dad kept his integrity throughout that whole situation."

Composition
The song is a piano-based rock ballad. It takes influence from a southern style of music and has been labeled as "gospel-tinged".

Release
The song reached No. 1 on R&R's CHR chart at the end of May 2008. By June 6, "Washed by the Water" had stayed at the No. 1 position for three consecutive weeks.

Reception
The song was generally well received by music critics. Jesus Freak Hideout editor John DiBiase said that it is "another one of the album's true gems, a piano-driven southern delight ... [It is] new territory that will no doubt spread a smile across the listener's face." Christa Banister of Christianity Today was also positive towards "Washed by the Water", saying that it "[packs] more emotional punch while Bear Rinehart's gravelly vocal rises to the top".

In February 2009, the song won the "Rock/Contemporary Song of the Year" award at the 2009 GMA Dove Awards. The song was also featured as About.com's Christian Music Song of the Week on October 15, 2007; editor Kim Jones labeled it as a "bluesy" and "awesome tune".

Music video
In the week of February 11–16, 2008, a music video was filmed for "Washed by the Water". The video premiered on April 5, 2008, airing on JCTV's monthly Top Ten music video countdown.

Certifications

References

External links
"Washed by the Water" music video on YouTube

2007 singles
2008 singles
Gospel songs
Needtobreathe songs
2007 songs
Atlantic Records singles